Joaquín Alonso Hernández García (born March 1, 1994) is an American professional soccer player who plays as a forward.

Club career
Hernandez began his youth career in the city of El Paso, Texas. His rising talent increased his chances of professional football, so he relocated to Ciudad Juarez, Mexico to pursue this goal, where he made his start in the Indios youth system. Hernandez moved up the ranks at Indios and made two brief appearances with the first team in the Liga de Ascenso during the 2010–11 season.

In December 2011, however, Indios was disbanded, and Hernandez, out of a club, found a home with C.F. Monterrey, where he joined the Rayados' U-17 team.

Hernandez moved up to Monterrey's U-20 team for his first full season with the club. On April 19, 2013, he was called up to the first team and made his Liga MX debut.

Hernandez went on loan to Juárez in Ascenso MX in 2015–2016. He then played for Monterrey Premier for 2016–2017 and led the league in goals with 15.

Honors
Atlante
Liga de Expansión MX: Apertura 2021

References

External links
 
 
 
 

1994 births
Living people
American soccer players
American expatriate soccer players
Indios de Ciudad Juárez footballers
C.F. Monterrey players
FC Juárez footballers
Correcaminos UAT footballers
Cimarrones de Sonora players
American sportspeople of Mexican descent
Soccer players from El Paso, Texas
Liga MX players
Ascenso MX players
Expatriate footballers in Mexico
United States men's under-20 international soccer players
United States men's under-23 international soccer players
American expatriate sportspeople in Mexico
Association football forwards